Claes Norden (born February 21, 1993) is a Swedish professional ice hockey player. He currently plays for Linköpings HC of the Swedish Hockey League. He previously played with Mora IK of the HockeyAllsvenskan (Swe.1).

References

External links

1993 births
Living people
Linköping HC players
Mora IK players
Swedish ice hockey right wingers
Sportspeople from Linköping
Sportspeople from Östergötland County